Seven Churches is the debut album by American death metal band Possessed. The title of the album refers to the Seven Churches of Asia mentioned in the Book of Revelation. "The Exorcist" begins with producer Randy Burns' version of Mike Oldfield's Tubular Bells, arranged and performed as it was in the 1973 horror film of the same name. Seven Churches is widely regarded as the first death metal album to exist, and About.com named it one of the ten essential albums of the genre. Jeff Becerra was only 16 when the album was recorded.

Background
According to David Konow's Bang Your Head: The Rise and Fall of Heavy Metal, the album was recorded during the Spring Break of 1985 when Pinole Valley High School juniors Jeff Becerra and Larry LaLonde had ample time for studio production. Up until the release of the album, the band had practiced at manager Debbie Abono's house in Pinole, but had formed in the El Sobrante/San Pablo area, which was the location of Mike Torrao's and Mike Sus' garage band.

In November of the same year, the band flew to Montreal, Quebec, Canada for the WWIII Weekend Festival in support of the Seven Churches release, playing alongside Celtic Frost, Destruction, Voivod and Nasty Savage; the concert was Possessed's first and largest arena appearance, with nearly 7,000 in attendance.

Legacy and impact
While Florida's Death had released more albums and is also cited as an enduring death metal progenitor, Seven Churches predates the latter band's debut album Scream Bloody Gore by two years. The book Choosing Death: The Improbable History of Death Metal & Grindcore credited bassist/vocalist Jeff Becerra as initially creating the term in 1983.

Seven Churches has been interchangeably described as "connecting the dots between thrash metal and death metal", being "monumental" in developing the death metal style, and as being the "first death metal album", the latter attributed to interviews with (or literature by) musicians including Kam Lee (ex-Mantas/Death, ex-Massacre), the late Ronnie James Dio (ex-Dio, ex-Black Sabbath) and Steven Wilson (Porcupine Tree, Blackfield). Former Napalm Death drummer Mick Harris said his introduction to metal was Possessed's Seven Churches album, a personal recommendation to him by then-guitarist Justin Broadrick.

In its July 1986 review of Seven Churches, SPIN described the album as belonging to the "sub-mutated genre of death-metal" and being a "full-on Japanese-commuter-train-without-brakes of what this genre should sound like...bassist/vocalist Jeff Becerra regurgitates what have to be the most Stygian vocal utterances to date."

British extreme metal record label Earache Records stated that "....the likes of Trey Azagthoth and Morbid Angel based what they were doing in their formative years on the Possessed blueprint laid down on the legendary Seven Churches recording. Possessed arguably did more to further the cause of 'Death Metal' than any of the early acts on the scene back in the mid-late 80's."

"The Exorcist" is covered on the Cannibal Corpse's 1993 EP Hammer Smashed Face, on Cavalera Conspiracy's 2008 album Inflikted, and on Death's 2011 reissue of their 1993 album Individual Thought Patterns.

In August 2014, Revolver placed Seven Churches on its "14 Thrash Albums You Need to Own" list.

Track listing

Personnel
Possessed
Jeff Becerra − bass, vocals
Larry LaLonde − lead guitar
Mike Torrao − rhythm guitar
Mike Sus − drums

Production
Randy Burns − keyboards on tracks 1 and 9, producer, engineer
Barry Kobrin − executive producer

References

Possessed (band) albums
1985 debut albums
Combat Records albums
Roadrunner Records albums